GPI mannosyltransferase 3 is an enzyme that in humans is encoded by the PIGB gene.

This gene encodes a transmembrane protein that is located in the endoplasmic reticulum and is involved in GPI-anchor biosynthesis. The glycosylphosphatidylinositol (GPI) anchor is a glycolipid found on many blood cells and serves to anchor proteins to the cell surface. This gene is thought to encode a member of a family of dolichol-phosphate-mannose (Dol-P-Man) dependent mannosyltransferases.

References

Further reading